Toniolo is a family name of Italian origin. It may refer to: 

 Deborah Toniolo, Italian long-distance runner
 Edoardo Toniolo, Italian actor
 Giuseppe Toniolo,  Italian Catholic economist and sociologist
 Leopoldo Toniolo,  Italian painter

See also

Tonioli
 
Italian-language surnames